Thomas Michelsen (born 27 September 1970) is a retired Norwegian football midfielder.

He started his career in Langhus IL, and joined Drøbak/Frogn ahead of the 1990 season. He played for SFK Lyn in 1993, and then rejoined Drøbak/Frogn. In 1996, he played for Skeid in the Norwegian Premier League. Ahead of the 1998 season he joined Moss FK. This was the first time that he played for another club than his twin brother Anders.

He retired after the 2005 season, having finished his career where it started, at Langhus.

References

Norwegian footballers
Lyn Fotball players
Skeid Fotball players
Moss FK players
People from Ski, Norway
Norwegian twins
1970 births
Living people
Drøbak-Frogn IL players
Twin sportspeople
Association football midfielders
Sportspeople from Viken (county)